A dart is a free flying top of a sounding rocket, and contains the payload. Its form is very aerodynamically designed. After the launch stage burned out the dart is detached and continues to rise only with its own inertia.

Some sounding rockets are available both with or without dart. The version without dart is able to transport more payload, but reaches lesser height.

Applications
Mohr Rocket
MMR06
Hopi Dart
Loki-Dart
Meteor
Mesquito

References 

Meteorological instrumentation and equipment